This list contains the rulers of Delhi Sultanate in chronological order.

Mamluk dynasty (1206–1290)

Khalji dynasty (1290–1320)

Outside the dynasties (1320)

Tughluq dynasty (1320–1414)

Sayyid dynasty (1414–1451)

Lodi dynasty (1451–1526)

Sources 
 Dynastic Chart,  The Imperial Gazetteer of India, v. 2, p. 368.
 
 Lodī dynasty - Encyclopædia Britannica
 City List – Delhi Sultanate Rulers, First to Last
 The Delhi Sultanate : How Many Lists of Dynasties and Rulers Delhi Sultanate?

Other literature 
 Sen, Sailendra (2013). A Textbook of Medieval Indian History. Primus Books. ISBN 978-9-38060-734-4.